Young Swedes have been the youth section within the Sweden Democrats since 1 October 2015. National spokesperson since October 2022 is Emil Eneblad. According to Jimmie Åkesson, the party leader of the Sweden Democrats, the sections main goal is to "attract young people to vote for the party". The section itself says that its main task is to "prepare young people to become future Sweden Democratic politicians." They uses the Engelbrektsbågen as a symbol and describes itself as democratic and socially conservative with a nationalist outlook. 

Unlike the former youth section Sweden Democratic Youth, the Young Swedes demands that its members are also members of the Sweden Democrats. The minimum age for membership in the section is 13 years. A difference compared to the other youth section in Sweden is that the delegates to the Young Swedes congresses are not elected by the sections members, instead being appointed by its national board.

History 
The new youth section was founded after the mother party broke ties with their original youth organization after the organisation was accused of racism and ties with extremist groups. The conflict culminated during the original youth organization congress in September 2015, when the election committees candidate Jessica Ohlson won the battle for the position of national spokesperson against the party leaderships candidate Tobias Andersson. A few hours after the congress, the Sweden Democrats decided to break with their youth organization, and a few days later the entire organizations leadership was expelled from the party.

On 1 October 2015, the Sweden Democrats launched their new youth section with Tobias Andersson as national spokesperson.

Symbols 

Both the name "Ungsvenskarna" and the symbol Engelbrektsbågen were previously used by the current Moderate Youth League after the General Electoral League (Allmänna Valmansförbundet) (the current Moderate Party) broke with their former youth organization SNF, since they had begun to approach nazism.

The Young Swedes national spokesperson Tobias Andersson expressed in an interview that the Moderate Youth League would probably "have problems" with the use of the name and symbol, but that "there will be some talk about this and that it's positive for us". The Moderate Youth League's chairman at the time, Rasmus Törnblom, for his part, announced that his youth league was reviewing the possibilities of legally questioning the use of the name and symbol.

National spokesperson 
Tobias Andersson, 2015–2022
Emil Eneblad, 2022–

References

External links 
Young Swedes official website 

Youth wings of political parties
Youth wings of political parties in Sweden
Youth wings of conservative parties